Cornelia Hoogland is a Canadian poet. She lives on Hornby Island, British Columbia, Canada, but also divides her time between London, ON.  Alongside her former work as a professor at the University of Western Ontario, Hoogland has performed and worked internationally in the areas of poetry and theatre. She is the founder and the co-artistic director of Poetry London, a literary periodical in London.

Works

Poetry 
Woods Wolf Girl (Wolsak and Wynn, 2011) is Hoogland's 6th book of poetry, and is based on the fairy tale, Red Riding Hood. Crow (Black Moss Press), was also released in 2011.  Her newest selection, a chapbook titled Gravelly Bay (Alfred Gustav Press, 2012), is set at the ferry terminal on Denman Island.

Theater 
Hoogland adapted Woods Wolf Girl for stage as Faim de Loup, which was dramaturged by Gil Garret and Susan Ferley and included in the 2012 PlayWrights Cabaret at the Grand Theatre in London, ON. Faim de Loup was selected for inclusion in the 2012 Women Playwrights International Conference, and performed as Talking in Bed. 

Hoogland's play, Country of my Skin won the Adjudicators Choice Award at the London One-Act Festival in 2004, Lesleigh Turner, Director. Janice Johnston directed the same play for In Good Company at the Aeolian Hall in October 2006 and in November 2006 "Country"  traveled to Jakarta, Indonesia to the Women Playwrights International conference. Her published play for children – Salmonberry: A West Coast Fairy Tale (International Plays for Young Audiences, Meriwether, 2000) – was performed at the 1999 International Women Playwrights Conference in Athens.

Bibliography
The Wire - Thin Bride - 1990
Marrying the Animals - 1995
You are Home - 2001
Cuba Journal:  Language and Writing - 2003
Second Marriage. Canadian Poetry Association, 2005 
Woods Wolf Girl - Wolsak and Wynn, 2011
"Crow" - Black Moss Press, 2011

References

External links
 Cornelia's Homepage
 'Woods Wolf Girl' Homepage
 'Crow' Homepage
 Poetry London Homepage
 Cornelia's other Homepage

1952 births
Living people
20th-century Canadian poets
21st-century Canadian poets
Canadian women poets
Academic staff of the University of Western Ontario
20th-century Canadian women writers
21st-century Canadian women writers
People from British Columbia
Dramatists and playwrights
Writers from British Columbia